The Wochenpost was an East German weekly. It was founded in 1953, and circulation peaked at over one million copies per issue from 1971 to the German reunification. The academic Deirdre Byrnes writes that the paper was "one of the most influential" publications in East Germany. Its highest circulation was around 1.2 million copies, making the paper the most popular weekly in East Germany. It was considered a paper for intellectuals. The paper continued to be published after German reunification until it ceased publication in late December 1996.

History
The paper published its first issue on 22 or 23 December 1953, around Christmas. The cover of the first issue was a depiction of a child blowing a candle out with the words "to all who are of goodwill." It was co-founded by Margot Pfannstiel, who also worked as chief reporter, Heinz Knobloch, who took responsibility for "puzzles, mental recreation and humour" ("Rätsel, Denksport und Humor"), and  Hilde Eisler. Pfannstiel left in 1958, and returned in 1968.  Work on the Wochenpost quickly became a principal vehicle for Knobloch's professional success over more than three decades. He served as its culture editor from 1957 to 1965, and between 1968 and 1988 contributed a weekly Feuilleton-format opinion column. Its first editor-in-chief was Rudi Wetzel. Circulation of the paper peaked at over one million copies per issue from 1971 to the German reunification. The academic Deirdre Byrnes writes that the paper was "one of the most influential" publications in East Germany.

The paper was characterized by providing "practical advice", such as how to decorate an apartment and how to dress fashionably. Wochenpost was not an opposition paper; the journalist , who worked at the paper for many years, noted that it was "no more opportunistic than its readers".

After the German reunification, the paper was purchased by Gruner + Jahr and Robert Maxwell and relaunched in Berlin. From 1983 to 1991, Brigitte Zimmermann was editor in chief of the paper.  By 1994 it was selling around 100,000 copies per week. The Independent compared the paper to Die Zeit. The paper was struggling by 1996 and ceased publication in late December.

References

Further reading
 

1953 establishments in East Germany
1996 disestablishments in Germany
Defunct newspapers published in Germany
Newspapers established in 1953
Publications disestablished in 1996